Fighting Over Nothing is the second EP release by pop duo Dash and Will. It features their leading single of the same name, "Fighting Over Nothing", and their first single "Pick You Up".

Track listing
All songs written by Charlotte Thorpe (Dash) & Josie DeSousa-Reay (Will).

"Fighting Over Nothing" – 3:00
"Make Or Break"  – 3:36
"Monday" – 3:37
"Champagne" – 3:50
"Pick You Up" - 3:16

2008 EPs
Dash and Will albums